Stephen Colp is a Canadian retired ice hockey center who was an All-American for Michigan State.

Career
Colp played junior hockey for the Richmond Hill Rams, scoring 80 points in 42 games in 1972. He came to attention of Amo Bessone and was brought in to Michigan State with the 1972 recruiting class. Colp debuted for the Spartans as a freshman and promptly led MSU in both goals and points in his first season. For his second year, Colp teamed up with fellow sophomore Tom Ross and the two formed one of the most dynamic duos in college hockey history. Colp's numbers shot up more than half again as much and he led the nation in scoring with 97 points, setting a new program record. Colp was named an All-American for the year but despite the huge offensive numbers he and Ross produced, Michigan State was stuck in the middle of the WCHA standings. In the conference tournament that year, MSU narrowly missed an upset of top-seeded Michigan Tech but ultimately fell in the second round. After his stellar season, Colp was drafted in the later round of both the NHL and WHA Drafts.

Colp missed a significant number of games during his junior season due to injury and ended up seeing his point total nearly cut in half. He rebounded sharply in his senior season, finishing with 94 points but finished behind Ross for the team lead (105). That season, Ross and Colp combined for 91 goals, nearly half of the MSU offense, and helped the Spartans to a second-place finish in their conference. The team made the second round of the WCHA tournament and found themselves in a battle with Minnesota. After tying the first game 2–2 they ended regulation of the second match knotted at 6 each and it took three overtime periods to decide the winner. Despite firing 78 shots on goal, the Spartans ended up on the losing side. At the end of his college career, Colp had an astounding 300 points in 138 games. He is one of only 5 players to score 300 points at the top level of college hockey (as of 2021) but he is second for Michigan State behind his long-time teammate Tom Ross. Colp is also tied for second all-time with 53 power play goals, again with only Ross ahead of him.

After graduating, Colp played one season of senior hockey before retiring.

Career statistics

Regular season and playoffs

Awards and honors

References

External links

1954 births
Living people
Canadian ice hockey centres
Ice hockey people from Toronto
Michigan State Spartans men's ice hockey players
AHCA Division I men's ice hockey All-Americans
Chicago Blackhawks draft picks
Cleveland Crusaders draft picks